Ambria may refer to:

, a German cargo ship in service 1922-25
Ambria (Star Wars), a minor planet in the sci-fi series
A female name from the derivative of Amber.